Charles John Godby (1851–1919) was the Dean of Melbourne from 1914 until his death.
 
Godby was educated at Magdalene College, Cambridge and  ordained in 1876. After a curacy in Newark he emigrated to Australia and was an incumbent in Seymour and Malvern, Victoria and also became a canon of St Paul's Cathedral, Melbourne in 1894.

He died in the final week of August 1919.

References

1851 births
Alumni of Magdalene College, Cambridge
Deans of Melbourne
1919 deaths